The 2016 Budha Subba Gold Cup was the 18th edition of the Budha Subba Gold Cup held in Dharan and sponsored by Red Bull. Eight teams from Nepal, Bhutan and India participated in the tournament. All matches were held at the ANFA Technical  Center Dharan.

Teams

Bracket
The following is the bracket which the 2016 Budha Subba Gold Cup resembled. Numbers in parentheses next to the match score represent the results of a penalty shoot-out.

Awards and Prize Money
Prize Money for winning team: NPRs 400,000 (Manang Marshyangdi Club)
Prize Money for runners-up: NPRs 250,000 (Nepal Police Club)
Best Player of the Tournament Award: Kiran Chemjong (Manang Marshyangdi Club) Prize: Yamaha Motorcycle
Highest Goal Scorer Award: Afeez Olawale (Manang Marshyangdi Club) NPRs 25,000
Best Coach Award: Tshring Lopsang  (Manang Marshyangdi Club) Prize money: NPRs 11,000
Best Striker of the Tournament Award: Anil Gurung (Manang Marshyangdi Club) Prize money: NPRs 11,000
Best Midfielder of the Tournament Award: Heman Gurung (Manang Marshyangdi Club) Prize money: NPRs 11,000
Best Defender of the Tournament Award: Suraj BK (Nepal Police Club) Prize money: NPRs 11,000
Best Goalkeeper of the Tournament Award: Kiran Chemjong (Manang Marshyangdi Club) Prize money: NPRs 11,000

References

Football cup competitions in Nepal
2015–16 in Nepalese football
Budha Subba Gold Cup